Kaf San (also Romanized as Kaf Sān; also known as Kabsān and Robāţ-e Kafsān) is a village in Galehzan Rural District, in the Central District of Khomeyn County, Markazi Province, Iran. At the 2006 census, its population was 484, in 135 families.

References 

Populated places in Khomeyn County